Stefan Marsh is an English professional rugby league footballer who plays as a  or er for the Leigh Centurions in the Betfred Championship. He previously played for the Wigan Warriors before being released at the end of the 2012 Super League season, which he spent on loan at Widnes.

Background
Marsh was born in Wigan, Greater Manchester, England.

Career

Wigan
Marsh was signed by the Wigan Warriors in 2007 from amateur side Wigan St Patricks. He made his first-grade début at the 2010 Magic Weekend at Murrayfield in a 28-10 win over Huddersfield.

Widnes
Marsh spent the 2012 season on loan at Super League club Widnes, developing into a specialist centre. After being released by Wigan at the end of the season, he rejoined Widnes on a permanent deal, signing a two-year contract.

References

External links
Widnes Vikings profile
SL profile
Statistics at wigan.rlfans.com
Statistics at rugby.widnes.tv

1990 births
Living people
English rugby league players
Leigh Leopards players
Rugby league centres
Rugby league fullbacks
Whitehaven R.L.F.C. players
Widnes Vikings players
Wigan St Patricks players
Wigan Warriors players